Fredrick Dewon Thomas Givens II (born March 29, 1996), known professionally as Fredo Bang, is an American rapper from Baton Rouge, Louisiana. He is best known for his tracks "Oouuh" and "Top" (featuring Lil Durk). In April 2020, he released his debut studio album, Most Hated, through Se Lavi Productions and Def Jam Recordings and executive produced by Moneybagg Yo.

Early life 
Givens was born on March 29, 1996, and raised on the south side of Baton Rouge, Louisiana. Givens grew up close to rappers Krazy Trey and Da Real Gee Money, both of whom were eventual victims of homicide in 2014 and 2017 respectively.

Career 
Givens gained recognition after the release of his July 2018 single "Oouuh". His highest viewed videos are "Top", "Father", Oouuh" and "Trust Issues" which all have reached over 20 million views on YouTube.

In January 2020, he was featured on Moneybagg Yo's track "Spin on Em", which received a music video in May 2020. The record was produced by Fredo Bang's go-to producers and close affiliates, DJ Chose and Hardbody B-Eazy. In April 2020, he released his debut studio album Most Hated, which peaked at number 110 on the Billboard 200.
On September 25, 2020, he released a new project titled In the Name of Gee, which peaked at number 40 on the Billboard 200.

Legal issues 
In January 2016, Givens was arrested on charges of attempted second degree murder. He served two years in jail for the charge before being released in 2018. He gets off parole in 2023.

On July 22, 2021, Givens was arrested again in Miami on a fugitive warrant out of Louisiana. He was arrested a day after his fellow Top Boy Gorilla artist Lit Yoshi, who was arrested on attempted murder charges.

Personal life 
Givens identifies as spiritual but not religious, although he believes in a God. He has one biological child with Annisaa Buffins and looks after Gee Money's children after Gee was murdered in Late 2017.

Discography 

Studio albums
 Most Hated (2020)

References 

Living people
1996 births
Rappers from Louisiana
Musicians from Baton Rouge, Louisiana
21st-century American rappers
Twitch (service) streamers
African-American male rappers
21st-century American male musicians
Trap musicians
Gangsta rappers
21st-century African-American musicians
American deists